Yernes is one of two parishes (administrative divisions) in Yernes y Tameza, a municipality within the province and autonomous community of Asturias, in northern Spain. 

The time zone is UTC+1(+2DT).

Villages and hamlets
 Vendillés (Vindiés)
 Yernes

Natural wonders
 Caldoveiro Peak

References

Parishes in Yernes y Tameza